Springwells Township is a defunct civil township in Wayne County, in the U.S. state of Michigan.  All of the land is now incorporated as part of the cities of Detroit and Dearborn. It is also famously known as the birthplace of Henry Ford.

History
Springwells Township was formed by an act of the territorial governor Lewis Cass on January 5, 1818, but the boundaries were not firmly designated until 1827.  The township was named for the many natural springs in the area.  Earlier, French explorers had named the area "Belle-Fontaine," French for "Beautiful Fountain."  In 1815, the "sand hill at Springwells" was the site of the signing of the Treaty of Springwells, which was attended by future U.S. President William Henry Harrison.

In 1842, the U.S. Army began construction of Fort Wayne at the Detroit River, now listed in the National Register of Historic Places.

Partitioned many times, by the 1850s Springwells Township bordered Detroit to its east, Greenfield Township to its north,  Redford Township to its northwest, Dearborn Township to its west, Ecorse Township to its south, and the Detroit River to its east.

According to the research of author Richard Bak, there was a series of unsolved deaths in the 1880s that occurred under suspicious circumstances.  These events have gone largely forgotten, but stand amongst Wayne County's greatest unsolved crimes of all time.

Settlements of the former Springwells Township 
Delray – The Village of Delray existed in 1903. It was annexed by City of Detroit in 1906.
Fort Wayne – surrounding area annexed by City of Detroit in 1885.
Springwells – became a village in 1919, a city in 1924, renamed Fordson in 1925, consolidated with Dearborn in 1928.
Woodmere – The Village of Woodmere existed in 1903, and was located near the 250 acre Woodmere Cemetery that had been established following the American Civil War. It was annexed by City of Detroit in 1906.

Historical timeline

European exploration and colonization 
  1603 French lay claim to unidentified territory in this region, naming it New France.
  July 24, 1701 Antoine de la Mothe Cadillac and his soldiers first land at what is now Detroit.
  November 29, 1760 The British take control of the area from France.
  1780 Pierre Dumais clears farm near what is today's Morningside Street in Dearborn's South End.

Early U.S. history 
 1783 – By terms of the Treaty of Paris ending the American Revolutionary War, Great Britain cedes territory south of the Great Lakes to the United States, although the British retain practical control of the Detroit area and several other settlements until 1797.
 1787 – Territory of the US north and west of the Ohio River is officially proclaimed the Northwest Territory.
 December 26, 1791 – Detroit environs become part of Kent County, Ontario.
 1796 – Wayne County is formed by proclamation of the acting governor of the Northwest Territory.
 May 7, 1800 – Indiana Territory, created out of part of Northwest Territory, although the eastern half of Michigan including the Dearborn area, was not attached to Indiana Territory until Ohio was admitted as a state in 1803.
 January 11, 1805 – Michigan Territory officially created out of a part of the Indiana Territory.
 June 11, 1805 – Fire destroys most of Detroit.
 November 15, 1815 – Boundaries of Wayne County redrawn, county split into 18 townships.
 January 5, 1818 – Springwells Township established by Gov. Lewis Cass.
 October 23, 1824 – Bucklin Township created by Gov. Lewis Cass. The area ran from Greenfield to approximately Haggerty and from Van Born to Eight Mile.
 1826 – Conrad Ten Eyck builds Ten Eyck Tavern at Michigan Avenue and Rouge River.
 1827 – Wayne County's boundaries changed to its current .
 April 12, 1827 – Springwells and Bucklin townships formally organized and laid out by gubernatorial act.
 October 29, 1829 – Bucklin Township split along what is today Inkster Road into Nankin (west half) and Pekin (east half) townships.
 March 21, 1833 – Pekin Township renamed Redford Township.
 March 31, 1833 – Greenfield Township created from north and west sections of Springwells Township, including what is now today east Dearborn.
 April 1, 1833 – Dearborn Township created from southern half of Redford Township south of Bonaparte Avenue (Joy Road).
 October 23, 1834 – Dearborn Township renamed Bucklin Township.
 March 26, 1836 – Bucklin Township renamed Dearborn Township.
 January 26, 1837 – Michigan admitted to the Union as the 26th state. Stevens T. Mason is first governor.
 1837 – Michigan Central Railroad extended through Springwells Township. Hamlet of Springwells rises along railroad.
 April 5, 1838 – Village of Dearbornville incorporates. Village later unincorporated on May 11, 1846.
 1849 Detroit annexes Springwells Township east of Brooklyn Street.
 April 2, 1850 – Greenfield Township annexes another section of Springwells Township.
 February 12, 1857 – Detroit annexes Springwells Township east of Grand Boulevard.
 March 25, 1873 – Springwells Township annexes back section of Greenfield Township south of Tireman
 May 28, 1875 – Postmaster general changes name of Dearbornville post office to Dearborn post office, hence changing the city's name.
 1875 – Detroit annexes another section of Springwells Township.
 June 20, 1884 – Detroit annexes Springwells Township east of Livernois.

Incorporation as village 
 March 24, 1893 Village of Dearborn incorporates.
 1906 Detroit annexes another section of Springwells Township.
 1916 Detroit annexes more of Springwells Township, forming Dearborn's eastern boundary.
 December 9, 1919 Springwells Township incorporates as the Village of Springwells.
 October 16, 1922 Springwells Township (Village?) annexes small section of Dearborn Township east of present-day Greenfield Road.
 December 27, 1923 Voters approve incorporation of the City of Springwells. It officially became a city April 7, 1924.
 September 9, 1924 Village of Warrendale incorporates.
 April 6, 1925 Warrendale voters and residents of remaining Greenfield Township approve annexation by Detroit.
 May 26, 1925 The Village of Dearborn annexes most of Dearborn Township.
 December 23, 1925 The City of Springwells changes its name to the City of Fordson.
 September 14, 1926 Election approves incorporation of village of Inkster from an eastern portion of Nankin Township and a western portion of Dearborn Township, causing the unincorporated part of Dearborn Township to be separated into two unconnected sections.

Formation of Dearborn's Historic Springwells Park Neighborhood 
On February 14, 1927, Village of Dearborn residents voted to become a city. The following year on June 12, 1928 voters approved consolidation of the City of Dearborn (population 9,000), City of Fordson (population 33,000) and part of Dearborn Township consolidated into the City of Dearborn. On January 9, 1929 Clyde M. Ford was elected as the first mayor of Dearborn. The Historic Springwells Park Neighborhood was established in 1939 by Edsel B. Ford to provide company executives and auto workers with upscale housing accommodations.

Notable natives
 Eddie Cicotte, baseball pitcher and member of the Black Sox who threw the 1919 World Series
 Henry Ford, American industrialist and inventor of Ford Motor Company.

References 

Defunct townships in Michigan
Former townships in Wayne County, Michigan
1818 establishments in Michigan Territory
Populated places established in 1818
1926 disestablishments in Michigan
Populated places disestablished in 1926